William Brainerd Spencer (February 5, 1835 – February 12, 1882) was an attorney and politician of the planter class, elected as U.S. Representative from Louisiana in 1876, in a contested election decided in his favor and against the Republican Party candidate. That year the Democratic Party regained control of the Louisiana state legislature.

He resigned when appointed in 1877 as Associate Justice of the Louisiana Supreme Court, serving until 1880. After that he resumed the practice of law.

Early life, education and marriage
Born on "Home Plantation," in Catahoula Parish, Louisiana, Spencer received his early schooling under private tutors. His parents were slaveholders. He was graduated from Centenary College, Jackson, Louisiana, in 1855 and from the law department of the University of Louisiana at New Orleans (now Tulane University) in 1857.  He married Henrietta Elam, sister of Joseph Barton Elam, who would later serve in the United States Congress.

Career
Spencer was admitted to the bar in 1857 and commenced practice in Harrisonburg, Louisiana.
He served in the Confederate States Army, with the rank of captain, until 1863, when he was captured.  He was held as a prisoner of war at Johnson's Island, Ohio, until the close of the Civil War.

After returning to Louisiana, Spencer resumed the practice of law in Vidalia, in 1866. He successfully contested as a Democrat a special election against Republican Frank Morey. He was elected to the Forty-fourth Congress and served from June 8, 1876, to January 8, 1877, when he resigned to accept a judicial appointment.

Spencer was appointed Associate Justice of the Louisiana Supreme Court on January 9, 1877, which position he held until his resignation April 3, 1880. He again resumed the practice of law in New Orleans, Louisiana.

According to his tombstone, he died in Cordóba, Mexico, April 29, 1882. He was interred in Magnolia Cemetery, Baton Rouge, Louisiana in 1882.

References

External links 
 

1835 births
1882 deaths
Justices of the Louisiana Supreme Court
Centenary College of Louisiana alumni
Tulane University Law School alumni
Confederate States Army officers
Democratic Party members of the United States House of Representatives from Louisiana
19th-century American politicians
People from Catahoula Parish, Louisiana
People from Vidalia, Louisiana
Burials at Magnolia Cemetery (Baton Rouge, Louisiana)
19th-century American judges